Pavol Molnár (13 February 1936 – 6 November 2021) was a Slovak footballer who played as a forward. He played for Czechoslovakia national team in 20 matches and scored three goals.

He was a participant at the 1958 FIFA World Cup, where he played in three matches, and at the 1962 FIFA World Cup, where his team won the silver medal.

Molnár played for SK Slovan Bratislava and later CH Bratislava.

References

External links
 
 
 

1936 births
2021 deaths
Footballers from Bratislava
Slovak footballers
Czechoslovak footballers
Association football forwards
Czechoslovakia international footballers
1958 FIFA World Cup players
1960 European Nations' Cup players
1962 FIFA World Cup players
ŠK Slovan Bratislava players
FK Inter Bratislava players